Yee Soo-kyung (이수경, born 1963) is a South Korean multi-disciplinary artist and sculptor best known for her Translated Vase series which utilizes the broken fragments of priceless Korean ceramics to form a new sculpture. Yee's biomorphic sculptures highlight the beauty and possibility after rupture. Her other works in installation and drawings explore psycho-spiritual introspection, cultural deconstruction, kitsch, as well as Korean traditional arts and history melded with contemporary aesthetics.

Biography 
Yee Soo-Kyung was born in Seoul, Korea in 1963. She attended Seoul National University in 1989 to study Western painting for her BFA and MFA. Despite her choice of major, her early works from the 1990s were mainly installations, video art, and performance. These works were influenced by the post-Minjung movement that was more socially focused and critiqued the state of Korean society. Her religious background includes both Buddhism and Catholicsim, and she is not particularly beholden to one or another. She views religions as an expression of human desire. Personal narrative, spirituality, and references from popular culture are continuous themes within her art.

In 2001, she was a participant in the Albisola Biennale in Italy and she was interested in the ceramic culture of Italy due to the historical accounts of how Pablo Picasso and Lucio Fontana would make ceramics there. The Biennale connected local Italian artisans with international guest artists to create collaborations for the exhibition. Thus Yee was introduced to a female Italian potter and showed her a Korean poem that sung the praises of Joseon pottery which was written in 1947 by Kim Sang-ok called “Ode to Porcelain.” The potter had no prior knowledge of Joseon pottery and therefore used her imagination that she gained from reading the poem to create 12 white porcelain pieces in the style of 18th century Joseon vessels. The collaboration was called Translated Vase Albisola. While the name of this piece coincides with her famous sculptures they are not comparable. Regarding this piece Yee remarked that, “The Joseon white porcelain was translated into real objects, from just intangible words to tangible artworks.” However this experiment got her interested in Joseon pottery and she was then introduced to through a friend to the famous ceramicist, Paek Lim-hang, who was active in Incheon, Gyeonggido. A camera crew was there filming the master  potter and she witnessed him breaking almost all of the pots that came out of the kiln due to the smallest defects or flaw. This act is to keep the quality and price of the potter's wares very high but she was shocked by how merciless the process was. With the permission of the potter she took all the broken fragments home and one day say that two broken pieces could fit together like a puzzle. From then on she started glueing pieces together and covering the glue with gold. This marked the beginning of her world-renowned Translated Vase series.

Yee celebrates discarded pieces that were deemed unworthy and grants them a new life by reassembling them into new forms. She sees potentiality in things that are discarded and places value on all existing things as they are. This act of “translating” value is a process in which the artist pays homage to psychic wounds through the shamanistic redemption of the once discarded object(s). Each Translated Vase is a collaboration between Yee and another artist since she is using their discarded pieces. In 2012, she used the pieces of Young Sook Park, whose known for her moon jars, to make a sculpture of an actual moon.

In 2004 she also created her Daily Drawing series as a way to record her thoughts and feelings during a tumultuous time in her life. Through these drawings, she explored how to confront and heal psychological wounds through art. Rather than turning away or trying to forget about such wounds, she embraces suffering and hardship as a way to reach transcendence. This mindset of embracing and reviving memories through wounds is also present within her into her landmark Translated Vase series.

In 2005, she used cinnabar, a red mineral pigment used to make talismans and Buddhist paintings. Her pieces featured the delicate line drawings of the female body holding white vases. The drawing first began with one woman and then through a repetitious process of filling up the paper in a symmetrical manner, she finished the drawing with a proliferation of female figures and white vases decorated with blue patterns. 12 pieces were created in this manner and it conjured the story of Princess Bari, who was cast away by the King since her mother, the queen, only gave birth to daughters. Bari eventually saves the King and Queen from a fatal illness by finding a magic elixir in the realm of the dead. Princess Bari is seen as the mother of Korean shamans. Like Buddhist monks, when Yee draws, she breaks down boundaries in the external world to practice transcendence.

In the artist's Flame series, started in 2008, she uses drawing to explore bodily expression on a flat plane. Thin lines that unfurl over the page index the body in motion and also the rhizomatic nature of an idea. Her drawing practice is sort of religious act that offers her a meditative space and the images she creates evoke Buddhist paintings of the cosmos. The ancient syle of her drawings are inspired by Goguryeo cave paintings. The undulating forms within her Flame series seem to have no start or end, thus communicating the idea that the self is always inextricably tied with all parts of space and the universe. The Very Best Statue series is Yee's ongoing project she started in 2008. This project had a participatory element where local residents of Echigo Tsumari, Japan and Anyang, Korea were given a survey to choose which body parts of Confucius, Lao Tzu, Mary, Jesus, Buddha, Mohammed, and Ganesh would be best for a sculpture. These religious founder's body parts were “sacrificed” and shed their unique corporeal formations to become the ultimate “other.” These figures were also chosen since they dedicated their lives to helping people transcend from the self into the “true” universal self, where no distinctions can be made. This democratic process of using surveys also erases the hand and will of the artist, further breaking down Yee's sense of self. It is telling that body parts of Jesus and Buddha are among the most frequently used in her Very Best Statue series.

In 2012, her solo exhibition, Constellation Gemini, Yee presented a series of drawing, installation, and sculpture works that were bilaterally symmetrical. While listening to Gregorian chants she had an epiphany about symmetry. She also featured a 12 sided pedestal which exhibited thousands of Translated Vases and solo fragments. This huge presentation of various ceramic pieces represented infinite plethora and the array of both single fragments and finished pieces highlight a shift in her thinking. Ceramic shards, presented on their own, show the artist's acceptance of the discarded object as inherently complete in itself (instead of needing to be unified). As aforementioned, the symmetry in all the other works presented in the exhibition show how mirror images are always a contestation of self and other, single and multiple, same but different. Her work sought to unify the space between self and other.

Technique 
Yee connects fragments of ceramic pieces together using glue and gold. In connecting disparate pieces she does not wish to heal or “fix” the objects, rather she want to use gold to glorify the “fateful weakness of being.” While some viewers liken her process to kitsugi, the Japanese art fo repairing broken vessels with gold, there is no connection. She chose to use gold due to the Korean word for “gold” and “crack” being homonyms. Putting broken vases back together is seen as a taboo or unlucky in Korean culture so she chose to emphasize flaws that have been denied by Korean culture. Her choice of using Korean porcelain is due to her interest in using objects made by ceramic masters who connect the past and present through their unique lenses.

Residencies 
Grass Mountain Art Residency, Taipei, Taiwan, 2015

Transfer Korea-NRW, Germany, 2012

Gyeonggi Creation Center Pilot Program, 2009

SSamzie Studio Program, Seoul, Korea, 2007

Villa Arson Residency Program, Nice, France, 2003

International Studio Program, Apex Art CP., New York, 1998

Artist in Market Place, Bronx Museum, New York, 1995

Public Collections 
Yee's works have been acquired in over 30 collections, including:

 Acrovista, Seoul, Korea
 ARCO Collection, IFEMA, Madrid, Spain
 Museum of Fine Arts, Boston, USA
 Bristol Museum, Bristol, UK
 The British Museum, London, UK
 Byucksan Corporation, Seoul, Korea
 Museo e Real Bosco di Capodimonte, Naples, Italy
 City of Echigo-Tsumari, Japan
 Fukuoka Asian Art Museum, Fukuoka, Japan
 Gyeonggido Museum of Art, Ansan, Korea
 Jeju Museum of Contemporary Art, Jeju, Korea
 Kumho Museum of Art, Seoul, Korea
 Leeum, Samsung Museum of Art, Seoul, Korea
 Los Angeles County Museum of Art (LACMA), Los Angeles, CA, USA
 Mystetskyi Arsenal, Kyiv, Ukraine
 M+ Museum, Hong Kong
 National Museum of Contemporary Art, Gwacheon, Korea
 Philadelphia Museum of Art, Philadelphia, USA
 POSCO Museum, Pohang, Korea
 Princeton University, New Jersey, USA
 Salama Bint Hamdan Al Nahyan Foundation, Abu Dhabi, UAE
 Seoul Museum of Art, Seoul, Korea
 Smart Museum of Art, The University of Chicago, Chicago, IL, USA
 Spencer Museum of Art, The University of Kansas, Lawrence, KS, USA
 Times Square, Seoul, Korea
 Uli Sigg Collection, Switzerland
 YU-UN Obayashi Collection, Tokyo, Japan

Selected Solo Exhibitions 
1992

Getting Married to Myself, Indeco Gallery, Seoul/ K Gallery, Tokyo, Japan

1996

Lee Sookyung, Artemesia Gallery, Chicago, Il, USA

1997

Domestic Tailor Shop, Kumho Museum of Art, Seoul, Korea

2002

Off-shoot Flower/ Painting/ Pottery, SSamzieSpace, Seoul, Korea

2004

Island Adventure, Alternative Space Pool, Seoul, Korea

2005

Breeding Drawing, Gallery SSamzie, Seoul, Korea

2006

Flame, One and J. Gallery, Seoul, Korea

2007

Earth Wind &Fire, Ilmin Museum of Art, Seoul, Korea

2008

Broken Whole, Michael Schultz Gallery, Berlin, Germany

Paradise Hormone, Mongin Art Center, Seoul, Korea

2009

Yeesookyung, Thomas Cohn Gallery, São Paulo, Brazil

Yeesookyung, Ota Fine Arts, Tokyo, Japan

Yee Sookyung im Schloß Oranienbaum, Museum Schloß Oranienbaum, Dessau, Germany

2010

Jung Marie’s Jeongga, Yeesookyung’s Devotion, Arko Art Center, Seoul, Korea

Broken Whole, Michael Schultz Gallery, Seoul, Korea

2011

Yeesookyung, Almine Rech Gallery, Brussels, Belgium

2012

Yeesookyung, Sindoh Art Gallery, Seoul, Korea

2013

Flame, Ota Fine Arts, Singapore, Singapore

2014

The Meaning of Time, Locks Gallery, Philadelphia, USA

Take Me Home Country Roads, Space Willing N Dealing, Seoul, Korea

2015

Yeesookyung: Contemporary Korean Sculpture, Asia Society Texas Center, Houston, USA

Saint Breeders, Atelier Hermès, Seoul, Korea

When I Become You, Daegu Art Museum, Daegu, Korea

When I Become You, Yeesookyung in Taipei, Museum of Contemporary Art Taipei, Taiwan

2019

Whisper Only to You, Museo e Real Bosco di Capodimonte, Naples, Italy

Whisper Only to You, MADRE · Museo d'arte Contemporanea Donnaregina, Naples, Italy

Fragments of Form-Carla Accardi, Yeesookyung, Massimo De Carlo, Hong Kong (two-person exhibition)

2020

I am not the only one but many, Massimo De Carlo, London, UK

Oh Rose!, Space Willing N Dealing, Seoul, Korea

2021

Gana Art Nineone, Seoul, Korea

Buk-Seoul Museum of Art, Seoul, Korea

Moonlight Crowns, Art Sonje Center, Seoul, Korea

References 

1963 births
Living people
South Korean sculptors